Green Acres is an American sitcom starring Eddie Albert and Eva Gabor as a couple who move from New York City to a rural country farm. The series was first broadcast on CBS, from September 15, 1965, to April 27, 1971.  All the episodes were filmed in color.

Series overview

Episodes

Season 1 (1965–66)

Season 2 (1966–67)

Season 3 (1967–68)

Season 4 (1968–69)

Season 5 (1969–70)

Season 6 (1970–71)

TV movie (1990)

See also
List of Petticoat Junction episodes
List of The Beverly Hillbillies episodes

References

Episodes
Green Acres